The Downtown DeLand Historic District (also known as downtown DeLand) is a U.S. historic district (designated on December 23, 1987) located in DeLand, Florida. The district is bounded by Florida & Rich Avenues, Woodland Boulevard, & Howry Avenue. It contains 68 historic buildings.

Gallery

References

External links

 Volusia County listings at National Register of Historic Places
 Athens Theater (Official Site)

National Register of Historic Places in Volusia County, Florida
Historic districts on the National Register of Historic Places in Florida
DeLand, Florida